The Inline Hockey World Championship is an annual inline hockey tournament organized by World Skate. Prior to the creation of World Skate in September 2017, the championship was administrated by the Comité International Roller In-Line Hockey (CIRILH), an organization and discipline of Fédération Internationale de Roller Sports (FIRS). It is the sport's highest-profile annual international tournament. 

The first men's World Championship was held was in 1995 and comprised twelve national teams. The structure established at the inaugural tournament featured all teams participating in a round-robin stage, followed by single elimination games to determine the champion. This basic format would be used until 2006, though the number of teams changed.

The modern format for the World Championship features eight teams in Group 1, and if there are more than eight teams, the rest compete in Group 2. All teams play a preliminary round, then the top six teams in Group 1 and top two teams in Group 2 play in the playoff medal round and the winning team is crowned World Champion. The remaining teams (bottom two in Group 1 and remaining teams in Group 2) play in a playoff round for the National Team World Cup, and the winning team is crowned World Cup champions. The World Championships are open to all players, both professional and amateur. The FIRS requires that players are citizens of the country they represent and allow players to switch national teams provided that they play in their new nation for a certain period of time.

The United States is the tournament's first dominant team, winning the tournament 14 of the 18 events held (as of 2012), as well as medaling in all but one tournament. The Czech Republic is the next most successful team, winning the tournament twice and winning 14 medals.

Due to the 2022 Russian invasion of Ukraine, World Skate banned Russian and Belarusian athletes and officials from its competitions, and will not stage any events in Russia or Belarus in 2022.

History
The first tournament was held in Chicago, United States in 1995. The United States won the tournament after defeating Canada in the final. The United States won the tournament a further three times before in 1999 they were beaten by Switzerland in the gold medal game. The following year the United States reclaimed the gold medal and again won it in 2001.

In 2002 FIRS expanded the inline program to include a women's tournament. Both the men's and women's tournaments were held in Rochester, New York, United States where Canada's men's and women's teams went on to win their respective tournaments. Through the next four years the United States continued their dominance in the men's tournament while in the women's both Canada and the United States competed in the final all four times by both winning two gold medals each.

In 2007 FIRS again expanded their inline program to include a men's junior tournament. The United States went on to win the first edition of the tournament after beating the Czech Republic in the final.

Due to the 2022 Russian invasion of Ukraine, World Skate banned Russian and Belarusian athletes and officials from its competitions, and will not stage any events in Russia or Belarus in 2022.

Tournament structure

History
The first World Championship held was in 1995. Twelve different nations participated. The nations were separated into three pools of four and played a round robin to determine seeding for a single elimination round to determine which nations would play for the gold.

In 1996, the World Championships switched to a slightly different format in which teams would be separated into larger pools for round robin play, then based on standings teams would qualify for the single elimination tournament. Teams that were eliminated would then compete in consolation games for final standings.

Pre–2006 format
All World Championships began with pool play in which all participating teams qualified for order and selection to participate in the championship medal games. Pool play consisted of one or more pools in which every team assigned to the pool plays all other teams in that pool. A predetermined number of teams finishing highest in the pool would go on to play in the championship medal games and the non-qualifying teams will compete for the final places remaining. The championship medal games were conducted as single elimination matches, with winners advancing and the losing teams playing placement games to determine their final championship positioning. No ties were permitted in medal competitions and were determined by sudden death overtime periods.

Round robin pool play
When the total team entry made it necessary to use a modified "round robin," teams would be seeded into two or more pools so that each pool would have "equal" strength which was based on their final placement at the previous year's World Championships. The teams were assigned to pools arranged according to serpentine positioning. When a team from the previous year's World Championship does not participate, their position is closed up and the serpentine continues with those teams that have competed in both championships. The national teams that did not compete in the previous World Championships would be arranged in alphabetical order according to the English spelling of the country's name and added to the serpentine, which continues until all teams are assigned to a pool.

Medal round competition
The pre-quarterfinals (if required), quarterfinals, semifinals and final games of medal round competition were conducted as single elimination matches. If a team lost in the pre-quarterfinals or quarterfinals, they were eliminated from any further advancement in medal play. The two semifinals losing teams played for the bronze medal; and the semifinal winners played for the gold medal, with the loser of that match receiving the silver medal.

When championship play consisted of 16 or fewer teams, the top eight teams were placed in the quarterfinals bracket according to the seeding determined by round robin play. With single pool round robin play, the first-place finisher played the last qualifying place, and so on through the remaining qualifiers. When round robin play consisted of two pools, the top seed in Pool A will play the bottom qualifying seed in Pool B, and so on, matching first place in one pool with last place in the other.

When championship round robin play consisted of 3 pools, 12 teams qualify and pre-quarterfinals were required. The winning team from each of the 3 pools would receive a bye into the quarterfinals. The fourth bye would be awarded to the team placing second in its pool with the best percentage of points earned divided by maximum points possible. If a tie exists between pools, the second place team with the lowest average goals-allowed per game in round robin play would draw the bye. If the tie still remained, a shootout would be held among all remaining second place round robin teams that are tied for receipt of the bye. The remaining eight qualifying teams would be seeded according to their respective placements into the pre-quarter final round, with the winners of each match advancing to face one of the four teams receiving the byes. Where possible, rematches of round robin pool opponents would be avoided in pre-quarterfinal and quarterfinal matches.

When championship round robin play consisted of four pools, pre-quarterfinals are required. The three highest placements in each of the four pools would advance to medal play. The winning team from each of the four pools would receive a bye into the quarterfinals. The remaining eight qualifying teams would be seeded into the pre-quarterfinal round, with the winners of each match advancing to face one of the four teams receiving the byes.

Placement games
Those teams not advancing to compete in medal competition from the preliminary pool play would play additional matches to determine their overall championship positions. Those games would take place in increments of two, three or four team units based upon their equivalent round robin pool rankings. The placement games would determine their ultimate position within their selected pool strata. Where there were two pools in the round robin, a four team match is possible which pits the higher placement team against the lower of the open placements and the winners for the two higher positions. In a three team match, each team would play the other in a mini-round robin to fill these open positions. That procedure of layered competition would be repeated until all teams from the round robin that are no longer competing for championship medals had been placed.

Modern group 1 and group 2 format

Round robin pool play
Starting in 2006, when the number of teams entered into the World Championships makes it necessary to use modified round robin pool play, teams will be seeded into pools based on their final placement at the previous year's FIRS World Championships. These teams will be divided into two groups. The teams finishing one through eight placements will be named to be in Group 1 and arranged therein by two pools of four each, according to serpentine positioning. The remaining team with placements from the previous year (ninth, tenth and so on) will be situated into Group 2, also arranged into pools so that each pool, as nearly as possible, has equal strength, according to the serpentine positioning. Teams from the previous year's World Championship that do not enter will have their positions closed up and the serpentine will continue with those teams that have competed in both the last and current championships.

National teams that enter the World Championship that did not compete in the previous year will be arranged in alphabetical order according to the English spelling of the country's name and added to the serpentine of Group 2, which continues until all teams are assigned to a pool. Should there be one or more vacancies in the eight teams assigned to Group 1, created by the absence of teams that finished in the top eight from the previous World Championship, these open positions in Group 1, will be filled by any national team reentering the World Championship which had finished in the top eight placements during any of the previous three World Championships. If there are more eligible teams than there are open pool positions in Group 1, priority will be given to that team with the highest previous placement, and if more than one team is similarly positioned, then the most recent of these shall be selected. There will never be more than eight teams in Group 1, but should there be a vacancy remaining, the CIRILH Executive Committee is authorized to seed an entirely new team into Group 1, if in their opinion, such nation has the hockey tradition and player talent necessary to compete successfully at the Group 1 level. Teams that finished ninth or higher last year shall not be forced by vacancies into Group 1.

Medal round competition
In Group 1, the highest finishing three teams from each of the two Pools A and B will advance to the quarterfinals, a sum of six from Group 1. There will be an addition of one team from each of the two C and D Pools in Group 2, making the total quarterfinal entry eight teams. These teams will be placed in the quarterfinals bracket according to the seeding determined by round robin play, with the placement in Group 1 considered superior to Group 2. The first-place finisher plays the last qualifying place, and so on through the remaining qualifiers, matching first place in one pool with last place in the other.

The teams eliminated from Group 1 World Championship medal play, will join as top seeds with the highest finishing three teams remaining in each of Pools C and D in Group 2 for a total of eight teams, which will comprise the National Team World Cup quarterfinals in single elimination competition. These teams will be placed in the quarterfinals bracket according to the seeding determined by round robin play, with placements in Group 1 considered superior to Group 2. The highest place team will be paired with the last qualifying place, and so on through the remaining qualifiers, matching top place in one pool with last place in the other.

Placement games
Placement games still take place in the same fashion as previous years.

Other men's national team tournaments
World Championships
 FIRS Junior Men's Inline Hockey World Championships
 FIRS Master's World Cup

Other competitions
 Inline hockey at the World Games
 Inline hockey at the Pan American Games

Tournament results

Senior men

Medal table

Senior women

Medal table

Junior men

Junior women

Veteran men

References
General
History of the Tournament. International Roller Sports Federation. Archived from the original on 2011-01-09. Retrieved 2011-01-09.

Specific

See also
IIHF Inline Hockey World Championship

External links
International Roller Sports Federation
Worldinlinehockey.org

Inline hockey tournaments